Fady Joudah is a Palestinian-American poet and physician. He is the 2007 winner of the Yale Series of Younger Poets Competition for his collection of poems The Earth in the Attic.

Life
Joudah was born in Austin, Texas in 1971 to Palestinian refugee parents, and grew up in Libya and Saudi Arabia. He returned to the United States to study to become a doctor, first attending the University of Georgia in Athens, and then the Medical College of Georgia, before completing his medical training at the University of Texas. Joudah currently practices as an ER physician in Houston, Texas.  He has also volunteered abroad with the humanitarian organization Doctors Without Borders.

Joudah's poetry has been published in a variety of publications, including Poetry, The Iowa Review, Beloit Poetry Journal, The Kenyon Review, Drunken Boat, Prairie Schooner and Crab Orchard Review.

In 2006, he published The Butterfly's Burden, a collection of recent poems by Palestinian poet Mahmoud Darwish translated from Arabic, which was a finalist for the 2008 PEN Award for Poetry in Translation.

In 2012, Joudah published Like a Straw Bird It Follows Me, and Other Poems, a collection of poems by Palestinian poet Ghassan Zaqtan translated from Arabic, which won the 2013 International Griffin Poetry Prize. In 2017, Joudah translated Zaqtan's The Silence That Remains. His most recent book of poetry, Alight was published in 2013.  His 2021 poetry collection, Tethered to the Stars, was cited by Cleveland Review of Books as a poetry collection that "does not teach us how to answer any question it poses with a stylized rhetoric, a self-important flourish; the poems model a lyrical thinking which prompts the question itself."

In other media
In October 2014, Joudah was interviewed for the documentary Poetry of Witness, directed by independent filmmakers Billy Tooma and Anthony Cirilo.

Works

 

Alight (Copper Canyon Press, 2013)
 
Contributor to A New Divan: A Lyrical Dialogue between East and West. Gingko Library, 
Tethered to Stars (Milkweed Editions, 2021)

References

American emergency physicians
American male poets
Palestinian poets
Living people
American people of Palestinian descent
Writers from Austin, Texas
1971 births
Yale Younger Poets winners
21st-century American poets
Translators of Mahmoud Darwish
21st-century translators
21st-century American male writers